Working in the Theatre is the American Theatre Wing’s documentary series created to highlight the theatre industry's inner-workings. The series profiles notable members of the industry, and provides a closer look at unique stories and important work. Working in the Theatre aims to inform audiences about typically less well-known aspects of the theatre by sharing The Wing's extensive knowledge of the industry. The series has been running for more than four decades, and has featured extraordinary work from numerous members of the industry. Working in the Theatre receives leadership support from Doris Duke Charitable Foundation and The Dorothy Strelsin Foundation. The series is also supported, in part, by the New York City Department of Cultural Affairs in partnership with the City Council and the New York State Council on the Arts with the support of Governor Andrew Cuomo and the New York State Legislature.

History 
Working in the Theatre was initially broadcast from the Graduate Center of the City University of New York, led by Wing chair at the time Isabelle Stevenson, and moderated by various board members. Until 2005, the series was only available for viewing on CUNY-TV, a local New York City television station, or at a few NYC libraries. In March 2005 it was announced that The Wing would be releasing Working in the Theatre episodes for free streaming online.

Current production 
In July 2017, The Wing was $60,000 in National Endowment for the Arts (NEA) grants, $25,000 of which will directly support Working in the Theatre.

Episode list

Notable guests 
 Actors/Actresses
 Nathan Lane, Cherry Jones, Matthew Broderick, Lea Salonga, Phylicia Rashad, Natasha Richardson, Jessica Lange, Brian Stokes Mitchell, Jennifer Ehle, Adam Pascal
 Producers
 Emanuel Azenberg, Jeffrey Seller, Harold Prince
 Playwrights
 Edward Albee, Tony Kushner, David Henry Hwang
 Composers/Lyricists
 Mary Rodgers, David Yazbek
 Directors/Choreographers
 David Esbjornson, Julie Taymor, Moises Kaufman
 Lighting/Sound/Set/Costume Designers
 Lighting: Beverly Emmons, Jules Fisher, Natasha Katz, Howell Binkley
 Sound: David Meschter, Abe Jacob
 Scenic: David Rockwell, Eugene Lee
 Costume: Mary Peterson, Ann Roth

Awards and recognition 
 2020 - Daytime Emmy: Outstanding Directing Special Class (nomination)
 2019 - Daytime Emmy: Outstanding Special Class Series (nomination)
 2019 - Daytime Emmy: Outstanding Directing Special Class (nomination)
 2018 - Webby Award: Online Film & Video: Documentary, Series (nomination)
 2017 - Daytime Emmy: Outstanding Special Class Series (nomination)
 2017 - Telly Award: Documentary (win - bronze telly)
 2017 - Brooklyn Webfest (nomination)
 2016 - Telly Award: Documentary (win - silver telly)
 2016 - Brooklyn Webfest (win)
 2016 - Webby Award: Online Film & Video: Documentary, Series (nomination)
 2015 - W3 Awards: Online Video - Documentary (win - silver award)

Related content 
In 2006, a book series highlighting Working in the Theatre was published by Bloomsbury publishing, and edited by Robert Emmet Long. The series included three books, each highlighting WIT guests' insight to the theatre industry. 
 Acting
 Foreword by Kate Burton
 Featuring: Brian Dennehy, Matthew Broderick, Nathan Lane, Blythe Danner, Joel Grey, Anne Heche, Dana Ivey, Swoosie Kurtz, Jessica Lange, Brian Stokes Mitchell, Cherry Jones, Tonya Pinkins, Phylicia Rashad, Vanessa Redgrave, Michael Crawford, Mercedes Ruehl, Patrick Stewart, Richard Thomas, Irene Worth, Natasha Richardson, and more
 Producing and the Theatre Business
 Foreword by Elizabeth Ireland McCann
 Featuring: Daryl Roth, David Stone, Todd Haimes, Fran Weissler, Mel Brooks, Richard Frankel, Margo Lion, Kevin McCollum, André Bishop, Neil Pepe, Thomas Schumacher, Emanuel Azenberg, Thomas Viertel, Michael David, Susan Gallin, Jeffrey Seller, Barry Grove, Judy Craymer, Robyn Goodman, Harold Prince, and more
 Writing
 Foreword by Paula Vogel
 Featuring: Edward Albee, Arthur Kopit, Lisa Kron, Christopher Durang, Marsha Norman, Brian Clark, Terrence McNally, Harvey Fierstein, Juan Guare, August Wilson, Samm-Art Williams, Charles Strouse, Roberto Aguirre-Sacasa, Alfred Uhry, Peter Parnell, Arthur Miller, Robert Anderson, Tony Kushner, David Auburn, Charles Busch, David Henry Hwang, John Patrick Shanley, and more

References

External links

1976 American television series debuts
Public television in the United States
1980s American documentary television series
1990s American documentary television series
2000s American documentary television series
2010s American documentary television series
Theatre in the United States
Television articles with incorrect naming style